Callum Charles Johnson (born 23 October 1996) is an English professional footballer who plays as a right-back for League Two club Mansfield Town.

Club career

Middlesbrough
Born in the Borough of Stockton-on-Tees, Johnson first represented Middlesbrough's Academy at under-9 level. He originally played as a defensive-midfielder but soon converted to the role of right-back and by July 2017, was invited by first team manager Garry Monk to train with the senior side. He was also a part of the Middlesbrough squad which competed in the 2015–16 UEFA Youth League.

Accrington Stanley
On 31 August 2017, Johnson joined Accrington Stanley on a short-term loan, lasting until the end of January. He then made his debut for the club on 9 September 2017 in the EFL Trophy against Middlesbrough's U21 side, playing in a central-midfield role and receiving a yellow card in the 81st minute. He then went on the play the full 90 minutes in their next EFL Trophy tie, again playing in central-midfield, on 2 October 2017 against Blackpool at the Crown Ground.

On 5 January 2018, Johnson signed permanently with the club on a two and a half year contract for an undisclosed amount.

Portsmouth
In September 2020 Johnson signed for Portsmouth. He scored his first goal for the club in an FA Cup tie against Bristol City on 9 January 2021. Having spent the 2021–22 season on loan at Fleetwood Town, Johnson was released at the end of the season.

Ross County
Johnson signed a two-year contract with Ross County in July 2022.

Mansfield Town 
On 13 January 2023, Johnson returned to English football, signing for EFL League Two club Mansfield Town for an undisclosed fee.

Style of play
Johnson is known to be a fairly versatile player, having played at right-back, centre-back, and defensive-midfield during his career.

Career statistics

Club

References

External links

1996 births
Living people
People from Yarm
Footballers from County Durham
Association football defenders
English footballers
Middlesbrough F.C. players
Accrington Stanley F.C. players
Portsmouth F.C. players
Fleetwood Town F.C. players
English Football League players
Ross County F.C. players
Scottish Professional Football League players
Mansfield Town F.C. players